Crag Hill is on the western edge of the Yorkshire Dales in northern England, not to be confused with the higher Crag Hill elsewhere in the county of Cumbria. It lies on the boundary of the Yorkshire Dales national park, but its summit is in South Lakeland district, Cumbria. It is part of a ridge including the neighbouring fells of Great Coum and Gragareth.

All three hills may be included in a single circular walk from High Moss near Whernside on the Ingleton to Dent road. The views are extensive, with panoramas of the Yorkshire Dales, Howgill Fells, the Pennines and the Lake District beyond.

The hill is listed as one of the waypoints in the Yorkshire Dales Top Ten (YDTT).

References

Peaks of the Yorkshire Dales
Mountains and hills of Cumbria
Dent, Cumbria